Zdeněk Rylich (7 March 1931) is a Czech basketball player. He was voted to the Czechoslovakian 20th Century Team in 2001. With the senior Czechoslovakian national team, Rylich competed in the men's tournament at the 1952 Summer Olympics. With Czechoslovakia, he also won the silver medal at the 1951 EuroBasket, the silver medal at the 1955 EuroBasket, the bronze medal at the 1957 EuroBasket, and the silver medal at the 1959 EuroBasket.

References

External links
 

1931 births
Living people
People from Nymburk
Czech men's basketball players
Olympic basketball players of Czechoslovakia
Basketball players at the 1952 Summer Olympics
Sportspeople from the Central Bohemian Region